Karnaphuli is an Upazila of Chattogram District in Chattogram Division, Bangladesh. 
Administration Karnaphuli Thana was established on 27 May 2000. Karnaphuli, a police station area under Chattogram's Patiya, has been upgraded to an Upazila.

Water bodies

Main river Karnaphuli

Administrative

Municipality
Karnaphuli

Union
 Char Patharghata
 Shikalbaha
 Char Lakhya
 Juldha
 Bara Uthan

See also 
 Upazilas of Bangladesh
 Districts of Bangladesh
 Divisions of Bangladesh

References

Thanas of Chittagong District